

3-D Man

Chuck and Hal Chandler

Delroy Garrett

8-Ball

Jeff Hagees
Jeff Hagees was created by Bob Budiansky and Bret Blevins, and first appeared in Sleepwalker #1. A former defense contractor who designed missile propulsion systems, Jeff Hagees took to playing pool to relieve the stress of his job. He soon amasses large gambling debts, which leads his employers to be suspicious that he is selling company secrets to pay them off. Despite having no proof, his employers fired him. Combining his love of pool with his engineering talents, he fashions a criminal identity for himself as 8-Ball, engaging in a highly successful crime spree in New York. In one of his costumed robberies, he faces the alien Sleepwalker. The hero nearly captures 8-Ball for the police, but Rick Sheridan (the human to whom Sleepwalker is bonded) wakes up, allowing 8-Ball to escape. When 8-Ball and Sleepwalker next meet, 8-Ball proves victorious; distracting the hero by shooting innocent bystanders. He attempts to kill Sleepwalker, but the hero manages to escape. Later, when Rick and Sleepwalker had switched bodies, 8-Ball and the Hobgoblin (Jason Macendale) attack Rick (believing Rick to be Sleepwalker) to win a $100,000 bet. The inexperienced Rick is no match which makes 8-Ball realize Rick was not the actual Sleepwalker. 8-Ball fights Hobgoblin to make stop, although by that time Rick is already dying.

At some point, 8-Ball is finally captured and imprisoned. He teams up with a number of other villains against the She-Hulk, although they're defeated.

8-Ball joins up with Freezer Burn, Humbug, and Whirlwind. They steal from the crime lord Ricadonna by breaking into her home later at night while she is at a party, unwittingly taking a dangerous computer virus. 8-Ball is tracked down at his grandmother's house by bounty hunters Misty Knight and Colleen Wing. Before he can give them any information, he is killed by the Wrecker

During the "Devil's Reign" storyline, 8-Ball turns up alive as an inmate of the Myrmidon. He recounts to his cellmate that he was revived by Hood to serve in his crime syndicate. While in the Myrmidon's cafeteria, 8-Ball tried to sit with the Wrecking Crew, the Enforcers, and the Death-Throws only to be turned away. An inmate called "Captain Confusion" tried to harm 8-Ball only to be defeated by 8-Ball's cellmate Moon Knight. After Moon Knight defeated Man Mountain Marko in a prison fight and got placed in solitary confinement, 8-Ball talked to him outside his cell while mopping the floors.

Second 8-Ball
The second 8-Ball is an unnamed criminal. He was seen at the Bar with No Name when Spider-Man arrived and fought the patrons there.

Third 8-Ball
An unnamed criminal who is given the original 8-Ball's gear is seen at Roderick Kingsley's side when the Hobgoblin his henchmen into fighting the Goblin Nation. After Hobgoblin is killed by the original Goblin King, 8-Ball is among the villains who defect to the Goblin Nation. Following Spider-Man's victory over the Goblin King, 8-Ball and the Hobgoblin's other former minions are seen at a bar, where they encounter Electro.

8-Ball is among the supervillains assembled by Missile Mate to join a different Goblin King and the Goblin Nation's remnants upon claiming that Kingsley had "abandoned" them.

He was later a member of Swarm's Sinister Six when they attack Spider-Man and the students of the Jean Grey School for Higher Learning. They surrender once Swarm is defeated by Hellion.

The villain is later seen involved with the Black Cat's criminal empire.

During the "Hunted" storyline, 8-Ball was seen as a patron at the Pop-Up with No Name.

References

Marvel Comics characters: 0-9, List of